The St. Louis Post-Dispatch is a major regional newspaper based in St. Louis, Missouri, serving the St. Louis metropolitan area. It is the largest daily newspaper in the metropolitan area by circulation, surpassing the Belleville News-Democrat, Alton Telegraph, and Edwardsville Intelligencer. The publication has received 19 Pulitzer Prizes.

The paper is owned by Lee Enterprises of Davenport, Iowa, which purchased Pulitzer, Inc. in 2005 in a cash deal valued at $1.46 billion.

Platform
On April 10, 1907, Joseph Pulitzer wrote what became known as the paper's platform:

I know that my retirement will make no difference in its cardinal principles, that it will always fight for progress and reform, never tolerate injustice or corruption, always fight demagogues of all parties, never belong to any party, always oppose privileged classes and public plunderers, never lack sympathy with the poor, always remain devoted to the public welfare, never be satisfied with merely printing news, always be drastically independent, never be afraid to attack wrong, whether by predatory plutocracy or predatory poverty.

History

Early years
In 1878, Pulitzer purchased the bankrupt St. Louis Dispatch at a public auction and merged it with the St. Louis Evening Post to create the St. Louis Post and Dispatch, whose title was soon shortened to its current form. He appointed John A. Cockerill as the managing editor. Its first edition, 4,020 copies of four pages each, appeared on December 12, 1878.

In 1882, James Overton Broadhead ran for Congress against John Glover. The St. Louis Post-Dispatch, at Cockerill's direction, ran a number of articles questioning Broadhead's role in a lawsuit between a gaslight company and the city; Broadhead never responded to the charges.  Broadhead's friend and law partner, Alonzo W. Slayback, publicly defended Broadhead, asserting that the St. Louis Post-Dispatch was nothing more than a "blackmailing sheet."  The next day, October 13, 1882, Cockerill re-ran an offensive "card" by John Glover that the paper had published the prior November (November 11, 1881).  Incensed, Slayback barged into Cockerill's offices at the paper demanding an apology.  Cockerill shot and killed Slayback; he claimed self-defense, and a pistol was allegedly found on Slayback's body.  A grand jury refused to indict Cockerill for murder, but the economic consequences for the paper were severe. Therefore, in May 1883, Pulitzer sent Cockerill to New York to manage the New York World for him.

The Post-Dispatch was one of the first daily newspapers to print a comics section in color, on the back page of the features section, styled the "Everyday Magazine."

20th century
At one time, the St. Louis Post-Dispatch had the second-largest news bureau in Washington, D.C., of any newspaper in the Midwestern United States.

After Joseph Pulitzer's retirement, generations of Pulitzers guided the newspaper, ending when great-grandson Joseph Pulitzer IV left the company in 1995.

The Post-Dispatch was characterized by a liberal editorial page and columnists, including Marquis Childs. The editorial page was noted also for political cartoons by Daniel R. Fitzpatrick, who won the 1955 Pulitzer Prize for editorial cartoons, and Bill Mauldin, who won the Pulitzer for editorial cartoons in 1959.

Several months prior to the anniversary edition, the newspaper published a 63rd-anniversary tribute to "Our Own Oddities", a lighthearted feature that ran from 1940 to 1990.

On May 22, 1946, the Post-Dispatch became the first newspaper in the world to publish the secret protocols for Molotov–Ribbentrop Pact.

During the presidency of Harry S. Truman, the paper was one of his most outspoken critics. It associated him with the Pendergast machine in Kansas City, and constantly attacked his integrity.

In 1950, the St. Louis Post-Dispatch sent a reporter, Dent McSkimming, to Brazil to cover the 1950 FIFA World Cup. The reporter paid for his own travelling expenses and was the only U.S. reporter in all of Brazil covering the event.

In 1959 the St. Louis Globe-Democrat entered into a joint operating agreement with the Post-Dispatch. The Post–Globe operation merged advertising, printing functions and shared profits. The Post-Dispatch, distributed evenings, had a smaller circulation than the Globe-Democrat, a morning daily. The Globe-Democrat folded in 1983, leaving the Post-Dispatch as the only daily newspaper in the region.

In August 1973 a Teamsters union representing Globe and Post-Dispatch staffers went on strike, halting production for six weeks.

21st century

On January 13, 2004, the Post-Dispatch published a 125th-anniversary edition, which included some highlights of the paper's 125 years:

 Coverage of Charles Lindbergh, who flew across the Atlantic despite being denied financial or written support from the Post-Dispatch.
 A Pulitzer Prize-winning campaign to clean up smoke pollution in St. Louis. In the late 1930s and early 1940s, the city had the filthiest air in the United States.
 Sports coverage, including nine St. Louis Cardinals championships, an NBA title by the St. Louis Hawks in 1958, and the 2000 Super Bowl victory of the St. Louis Rams.
 Coverage of the city's "cultural icons" including Kate Chopin, Tennessee Williams, Chuck Berry, and Miles Davis.

On January 31, 2005, Michael Pulitzer announced the sale of Pulitzer, Inc. and all its assets, including the Post-Dispatch and a small share of the St. Louis Cardinals, to Lee Enterprises of Davenport, Iowa, for $1.46 billion. He said no family members would serve on the board of the merged company.

As of 2007, it was the fifth-largest newspaper in the midwestern United States and the 26th-largest newspaper in the U.S.

On March 12, 2007, the paper eliminated 31 jobs, mostly in its circulation, classified phone rooms, production, purchasing, telephone operations and marketing departments. Several rounds of layoffs have followed.

On March 23, 2009, the paper converted to a compact style every day from the previous broadsheet Sunday through Friday and tabloid on Saturday.

On May 4, 2012, the Post-Dispatch named a new editor, Gilbert Bailon.

In 2015, the paper was awarded the Pulitzer Prize for breaking news photography for its coverage of protests in Ferguson, Missouri.

Circulation and cost
Circulation dropped for the daily paper from 213,472 to 191,631 and then 178,801 for the two years after 2010, ending on September 30, 2011, and September 30, 2012, respectively. The Sunday paper also decreased from 401,427 to 332,825 and then to 299,227. The circulation as of September 30, 2016, was 98,104 daily and 157,543 on Sunday.

According to a 2017 press release from Lee Enterprises, the paper reaches more than 792,600 readers each week and stltoday.com has roughly 67 million page views a month.

The paper sells for $2 daily or $4 on Sundays and Thanksgiving Day. The price may be higher outside adjacent counties and states. Sales tax is included at newsracks.

Weatherbird

On February 11, 1901, the paper introduced a front-page feature called the "Weatherbird", a cartoon bird accompanying the daily weather forecast. "Weatherbird" is the oldest continuously published cartoon in the United States. Created by Harry B. Martin, who drew it through 1903, it has since been drawn by Oscar Chopin (1903–1910); S. Carlisle Martin (1910–1932); Amadee Wohlschlaeger (1932–1981); Albert Schweitzer, the first one to draw the Weatherbird in color (1981–1986); and Dan Martin (1986–present).

Notable people 
Jerry Berger, society columnist, 1980–2004
 Bob Broeg, Hall of Fame baseball writer, 1946–2004
 Jacob Burck, political cartoonist, 1937–1938
 Cole Charles Campbell, editor, 1996–2000
 Richard Dudman, national affairs correspondent and Washington bureau chief, 1950–1981
Daniel R. Fitzpatrick
Derrick Goold, author and sportswriter
 Rick Hummel, Hall of Fame baseball writer, 1971–present
 Clair Kenamore, foreign correspondent, telegraph editor, feature writer and Sunday magazine editor, early 20th century
 Joe Mahr, Pulitzer Prize–winning investigative journalist, 2006–2009
 Rose Marion (ca. 1875-1947), feature writer
Harry B. Martin, cartoonist and golf writer
S. Carlisle Martin, cartoonist and illustrator
 Marguerite Martyn, reporter and artist (born ca. 1880, died 1948)
Bill Mauldin, cartoonist
 Bernie Miklasz, sports columnist, 1985–2015
 Robert Minor, political cartoonist, 1907–1911
 Joseph Pulitzer, publisher
 Charlie Ross, chief Washington correspondent and editor, 1918–1945
 Neal Russo, baseball writer and copy editor, 1947–1990
 Elaine Viets, columnist, 1975–2000
 Rosa Kershaw Walker society column, 1870s
 Joe Williams, film critic, 1996–2015
Amadee Wohlschlaeger, sports cartoonist
 William Woo, journalist and editor-in-chief, 1962–1996

See also

St. Louis Globe-Democrat, a major competing St. Louis daily newspaper, located one block away on the same street, closed in 1986
 St. Louis Sun, a short-lived competing daily newspaper started in 1989
 100 Neediest Cases, an annual charitable giving campaign sponsored in part by the Post-Dispatch
 Riverfront Times, the St. Louis weekly newspaper
 The Sporting News, a sports magazine that was started in St. Louis

References

Further reading
Jim McWilliams, Mark Twain in the St. Louis Post-Dispatch, 1874–1891 (Troy, New York: Whitston Publishing Company, 1997).
 Merrill, John C. and Harold A. Fisher. The world's great dailies: profiles of fifty newspapers (1980) pp 286–93
Daniel W. Pfaff, Joseph Pulitzer II and the Post-Dispatch: A Newspaperman's Life (University Park: Pennsylvania State University Press, 1991).
Julian S. Rammelkamp, Pulitzer's Post-Dispatch, 1878–1883 (Princeton, New Jersey: Princeton University Press, 1967).
Charles G. Ross and Carlos F. Hurd, The Story of the St. Louis Post-Dispatch (St. Louis: Pulitzer Publishing, 1944).
The St. Louis Post-Dispatch as Appraised by Ten Distinguished Americans (St. Louis, 1926).
Orrick Johns, Time of Our Lives: The Story of My Father and Myself, (New York, 1937). George Sibley Johns, father of the author, was editor of the Post-Dispatch for many years, and was the last of Joseph Pulitzer's "Fighting Editors".
Dan Martin, The story of the First 100 Years of the St. Louis Post Dispatch Weatherbird (St. Louis, 2001).

External links
 
 St. Louis Post-Dispatch Archive (1874–present)
 St. Louis Post-Dispatch photographs at the University of Maryland Libraries

Finding aids at the St. Louis Public Library 
 
 
 

 
St. Louis Post-Dispatch
Saint Louis Post-Dispatch
Saint Louis Post-Dispatch
Saint Louis Post-Dispatch
1878 establishments in Missouri
Companies based in St. Louis
Pulitzer Prize for Public Service winners
Pulitzer family (newspapers)